Gilbertsville may refer to:

Gilbertsville, New York
Gilbertsville, Pennsylvania
 Gilbertsville, Kentucky

See also 
Gilbertville, Iowa